, was a Japanese American multi-sport athlete who played in the All-America Football Conference (AAFC) and Japan's Nippon Professional Baseball.

Early life
Kaname Yonamine, a Nisei Japanese American, was born in Olowalu, Maui, Hawaii to parents Matsusai (September 1, 1890 – July 31, 1988) and Kikue (February 14, 1901 – February 26, 1999). Matsusai was an uchinānchu immigrant and Kikue came from Hiroshima. Yonamine attended Lahainaluna and Wallace Rider Farrington High School. The name of his high school was the origin of his nickname, originally Wallace, but quickly changed to Wally, which would later become his legal name.

Professional football career
Yonamine signed a $14,000 contract, playing running back for the San Francisco 49ers in their second season (1947). Doing so, he became the first football player of Japanese American ancestry to play professional football (Walter Achiu was the first Asian-American). In his one season with the team, he had 19 carries for 74 yards and caught 3 passes for 40 yards. His football career ended during the off-season, when he broke his wrist playing in an amateur baseball league in Hawaii.

Professional baseball career
In baseball, Yonamine was the first American to play professional baseball in Japan after World War II. A multi-skilled outfielder, Yonamine was also noted for his flexible batting style and aggressive baserunning during his career with the Yomiuri Giants and Chunichi Dragons. In Japan, Yonamine was a member of four Japan Series Championship teams, the Central League MVP in 1957, a consecutive seven-time Best Nine Award winner (1952–58), an eleven-time All-Star, a three-time batting champion, and the first foreigner to be a manager (Dragons, 1972–77).

Yonamine was the first American inducted into the Japanese Baseball Hall of Fame, admitted in 1994 for his achievements during his 12-year career with the Giants and Dragons.

Post-career
Yonamine operated a highly successful pearl store, "Wally Yonamine Pearls", with his wife, Jane. The store is located in Roppongi, Tokyo. They also had a branch of their store in California run by their children. In 2008, Yonamine joined the Japanese Master League team Nagoya 80 D'sers as a coach/part-time player.

After an extended battle with prostate cancer, Yonamine died on February 28, 2011, aged 85, in Honolulu.

Yonamine's nephew, Micah, was selected by the Philadelphia Phillies in the 29th round of the 2019 Major League Baseball draft.

See also 
 American expatriate baseball players in Japan

References

Further reading

External links

 Japan Baseball Hall of Fame
Dodgers to celebrate Japanese American Community Night

1925 births
2011 deaths
American baseball players of Japanese descent
American expatriate baseball players in Japan
Hawaii people of Okinawan descent
American football running backs
Baseball players from Hawaii
Chunichi Dragons managers
Chunichi Dragons players
Deaths from cancer in Hawaii
Deaths from prostate cancer
Japanese Baseball Hall of Fame inductees
Managers of baseball teams in Japan
Nippon Professional Baseball MVP Award winners
People from Maui
Players of American football from Hawaii
Salt Lake City Bees players
San Francisco 49ers (AAFC) players
Yomiuri Giants players